Mubarak Al Kabeer Port is a port in Bubiyan Island, Kuwait. The port is currently under construction. In April 2021, the port's first phase was completed (4 berths). The port is part of the Belt and Road Initiative.

Purpose

Mubarak Al Kabeer Port is part of China's Belt and Road Initiative. Under China's Belt and Road Initiative, the Mubarak Al Kabeer Port is part of the first phase of the Silk City project. The port is an essential part of Kuwait Vision 2035 as it will create many new job opportunities in Kuwait. Mubarak Al Kabeer Port will serve the economic interests of many countries including Kuwait, China, Iraq, and Iran. In addition, the port is one of the closest seaports to Central Asia. 

As of 2021, Mubarak Al Kabeer Port is currently under construction. According to MEED, the project's contract was awarded in November 2019. The port is set to be environmentally sustainable. In September 2020, it was reported that the port is 53% complete. In March 2021, it was announced that Kuwait and Pakistan will develop linkages between Gwadar Port and Mubarak Al Kabeer Port. 

In April 2021, the port's first phase was completed (4 berths). As part of Mubarak Al Kabeer Port's development, Bubiyan Island will contain power plants and substations. A 5,000-megawatt power plant has already been built in Subiya. There is a current road project connecting Mubarak Al Kabeer Port's first phase to the existing road network in Bubiyan Island. Mubarak Al Kabeer Port is among Kuwait's largest infrastructure projects in 2021. Mubarak Al Kabeer Port's fire stations are currently under development.

Mubarak Al Kabeer Port is part of the Gulf Railway project in Kuwait.

Foreign relations

The port entails developing mutually beneficial economic ties with Iraq. In early 2011, the port caused tensions in Iraq due to its proximity to Grand Faw Port. In September 2011, Iraq's foreign minister announced that the dispute over Mubarak Al Kabeer Port has been resolved.

In August 2019, Iraq sent a protest letter against Kuwait to the United Nations regarding the maritime area that lies beyond marker 162 in Khor Abdullah by upraising a shoal, namely Fisht al-Aych.

See also
 Madinat al-Hareer
 Sheikh Jaber Al-Ahmad Al-Sabah Causeway
 Al Mutlaa City
 Kuwait National Cultural District
 Sabah Al Ahmad Sea City

References

Belt and Road Initiative
Ports and harbours of Kuwait
Foreign relations of Kuwait
Foreign relations of China
Chinese investment abroad
Iraq–Kuwait relations